We Leave at Dawn is the debut album by British band Envy & Other Sins. It was released on 31 March 2008 by Polydor Records.

Track listing

Personnel
The following people are credited on the album:

Envy & Other Sins
Ali Forbes – lead vocals, electric guitar, acoustic guitar
Mark Lees – bass guitar, backing vocals
Jim Macaulay – drums
Jarvey Moss – keyboards, backing vocals

Additional musicians
Flick Murphy – additional vocals (track 10), violin
John Garner – violin
Stephanie Edmundson – viola
Mark Walken – cello

Production
Danton Supple – producer, mixing
Smit & Andy Savours – engineering
Gordon Davidson – assistant engineer
Zoe Smith – assistant engineer
Alex MacKenzie – assistant engineer

Artwork
Envy & Other Sins – artwork, design
Angelfire Creative – artwork, design

References

External links

We Leave at Dawn at Last.fm

Envy & Other Sins albums
2008 debut albums
Polydor Records albums